The 2018 Liga 3 National Zone Route was played from 14 July to 20 October 2018. A total of 32 teams competed in the national zone route to decide 20 of the 32 places in the national round of the 2018 Liga 3.

Teams

The following 32 teams entered the national zone route:
 

 757 Kepri Jaya
 Celebest
 Lampung Sakti
 Madiun Putra
 Persatu Tuban
 Persbul Buol
 Perseka Kaimana (rename it again after last year competing with the name Perseka Manokwari) 
 Persekam Metro

 Persekap Pasuruan
 Persepam Madura Utama
 Persewangi Banyuwangi
 Persiba Bantul
 Persibangga Purbalingga
 Persibas Banyumas
 Persida Sidoarjo
 Persih Masurai (formerly Persih Tembilahan)

 Persijap Jepara
 Persik Kediri
 Persikabo Bogor
 Bogor (formerly Persikad Depok)
 Persinga Ngawi
 Persip Pekalongan
 Persipon Pontianak
 Persipur Purwodadi

 Perssu Real Madura
 PS Badung
 PS West Sumbawa
 PSBI Blitar
 PSBK Blitar
 PSBL Langsa
 PSCS Cilacap
 PSGC Ciamis

There should be 40 teams relegated from 2017 Liga 2 competed in this route, but Pro Duta and Persifa Fak-fak disqualified. On 5 June 2018, PSSI disqualified PPSM Magelang and Sragen United. Also PS Bengkulu, PS Timah BaBel, and Persigubin Gunung Bintang withdrew from the competition. Later on 28 July 2018, PSSI disqualified Yahukimo because they didn't attend match coordination meeting in Gawalise Stadium.

Format
In the preliminary round, 32 teams divided into eight groups. Each group was played on a home-and-away round-robin basis, except for group 7 and 8 that is played on a home tournament. The winners and runner-ups from each group advanced to national round of 2018 Liga 3.

In the play-off round, third-placed teams on each group competed in a knockout round home and away tournament. Each winners advanced to national round of 2018 Liga 3.

Schedule
The schedule of each round was as follows.

Preliminary round
A total of 32 teams played in the preliminary round.

Group 1

|}

Group 2

|}

Group 3

|}

Group 4

|}

Group 5

|}

Group 6

|}

Group 7
On 28 August 2018, PS West Sumbawa withdrew from the competition after 3 matches. The other teams' results against PS West Sumbawa was annulled.

|}

Group 8

|}

Play-off round
A total of eight teams played in the play-off round: third-placed teams on each group.

Qualified teams

The following teams qualified from national zone route for the national round.

Notes

References

External links
 2018 Liga 3 fixtures at PSSI website

Liga 3
Liga 3
Liga 3